Shankar Dada Zindabad is a 2007 Indian Telugu-language comedy drama film directed by Prabhu Deva. Starring Chiranjeevi and Karishma Kotak, the film is a remake of the 2006 Hindi film Lage Raho Munnabhai and a sequel to Shankar Dada MBBS (2005). In addition, Dilip Prabhavalkar reprises his role as Mahatma Gandhi, while Srikanth and Sayaji Shinde play other supporting roles. The music is scored by Devi Sri Prasad and filmed by Chota K. Naidu.

Plot 
Shankar Dada is a local gangster (dada in Telugu) and ATM serves as his right-hand man. Shankar falls for Jahnavi, a radio jockey, after listening to her voice on an FM channel. When a contest is announced on Gandhi and his preachings with a chance to meet the radio jockey, Shankar hires a few professors forcefully to make his dream a reality.

With the help of the professors, Shankar manages to win the contest and meets her. Jahnavi invites him to "Second Innings" House where there are some old men to give a lecture on Gandhigiri. With no options left, Shankar goes to the library and reads about Gandhi. As he continues to study Gandhi, Shankar gets hallucination of watching Gandhi, whom he calls Bapu. It helps him in a way in giving good messages to society.

Shankar starts to visit the Second Innings House frequently to meet Jahnavi. Rajalingam, a cunning businessman, seeks to forcefully buy out that house, for the marriage of his daughter. Learning that Shankar's girlfriend Jahnavi is staying with those old men, Rajalingam sends Shankar and Jahnavi along with the old men on a foreign trip and gets the building vacated by ATM who is unaware of Rajalingam's plan.

Shankar who is furious upon knowing this demands Rajalingam to return that building and he starts using "Gandhigiri" instead of "Dadagiri". However, Rajalingam does not relent. In order to teach him a lesson, Shankar and the old men start staging Satyagraha. At one point, Shankar reveals to Jahnavi that he was not a professor and only a local dada. So Jahnavi hates him and leaves the place.

When Rajalingam's daughter's marriage was about to be canceled, Shankar enters the scene and tries to convince the bridegroom's father. Though he refuses to accept the alliance, his son insists on marrying the girl, as he became a fan of Shankar through the FM programme. Later, Shankar and Jahnavi reunite.

Cast

Soundtrack

The soundtrack was composed by Devi Sri Prasad and released by Aditya Music.

Reception 
Sify rated the film 3/5 and called the film "a faithful adaptation of Lage Raho Munnabhai" and a "clean family entertainer." G P Aditya Vardhan of the Rediff.com awarded the film 3.5 stars out of 5 and wrote: "The film has style, comedy, colourful dance sequences and megastar's trademark gait."

See also
 List of artistic depictions of Mahatma Gandhi

References

External links 

2007 films
2000s Telugu-language films
Indian drama films
Telugu remakes of Hindi films
Indian sequel films
Cultural depictions of Mahatma Gandhi
Films directed by Prabhu Deva
Films scored by Devi Sri Prasad